Partition Plan may refer to:

The 1947 United Nations Partition Plan for Palestine
The 1947 Partition of India
The 1947 partition of Bengal